John Gillespie (1873 – after 1893) was a Scottish professional footballer who played as a full-back for Sunderland and Bury.

References

1873 births
People from Larbert
Scottish footballers
Association football fullbacks
Greenock Morton F.C. players
St Mirren F.C. players
Sunderland A.F.C. players
Bury F.C. players
Stenhousemuir F.C. players
English Football League players
Scottish Football League players
Year of death missing
Footballers from Falkirk (council area)